Govinda, also rendered Govind and Gobind, is an epithet of Vishnu which is also used for his avatars such as Krishna. The name appears as the 187th and the 539th name of Vishnu in Vishnu Sahasranama.  The name is also popularly addressed to Krishna, referring to his youthful activity as a cowherd boy. Vishnu, or Krishna, is regarded as the supreme God in the Vaishnava tradition and also by much of the pan-Hindu tradition.

Etymology
In the word "Govinda", "Govu" means Indriyas. Govinda therefore means the all-pervading, omnipresent ruler of the sense organs, or Indriyas. "Govu" also means 'Vedas'. Hence Govinda is the supreme being who can be known through the Vedas. Govinda can also be translated as "protector of cows".

Interpretations

Govinda is a name of Krishna and also appears as the 187th and 539th name of Vishnu in the Vishnu Sahasranama, the 1,000 names of Vishnu.

According to Adi Shankara's commentary on Vishnu Sahasranama, translated by Swami Tapasyananda, Govinda has four meanings:

 The sages call Krishna "Govinda" as He pervades all the worlds, giving them power.
 The Shanti Parva of the Mahabharata states that Vishnu restored the earth that had sunk into the netherworld, so all the devas praised Him as Govind (Protector of the Land).
 Alternatively, it means "He who is known by Vedic words alone".
 In the Harivamsa, Indra praised Krishna for having attained loving leadership of the cows which Krishna tended as a cowherd, by saying, "So men too shall praise Him as Govinda."
Maharishi Mahesh Yogi, in his commentary on the Bhagavad-Gita, states that Govinda means "master of the senses". In the Mahabharata, when Draupadi's saree was stripped by Dushasana in the court of Hastinapura, it is said that Draupadi prayed towards Krishna (who was in Dwaraka at that time) invoking him as "Govinda" at the instance of extreme distress where she could no longer hold her saree to her chest. For this reason, it is believed that "Govinda" is how the Lord is addressed by devotees when they have lost it all and have nothing more to lose. This may be the reason why in colloquial Tamil and Telugu the slang-term "govinda" sometimes refers to the prospect of losing or failing in something important.

Prayers
A Hindu devotional composition called "Moha Mudgara", composed by Adi Shankara, summarises: "If one just worships Govinda, one can easily cross this great ocean of birth and death." This refers to the belief that worshipful adoration of Vishnu or Krishna can lead believers out of the cycle of reincarnation (samsara) and lead them into an eternal blissful life in Vaikuntha, 'the supreme abode situated beyond this material world' where Govinda (Vishnu) resides. The composition expresses the value of inner devotion to Vishnu.

See also
 Vishnu
 Gopal (Krishna)
 Achyuta
 Phalguna month (ruled by Govinda; this Govinda is different from the original Govinda, because he is not the son of Maharaja Nanda)
 Narayana
 Govinda Jaya Jaya an Indian devotional chant or song
 Govinda (Kula Shaker song)

References

Notes

External links
 Govind Shaligram
 Who is Govinda (Krishna)?
 Sacred Hindi verses describing Govinda

Titles and names of Krishna